The City-County Council of Indianapolis and Marion County is the legislative body of the combined government of the city of Indianapolis and the county of Marion in the state of Indiana. The council was established as part of the consolidation of city and county governments, enacted by Unigov on January 1, 1970.

The council is composed of 25 members elected to four-year renewable terms, each representing an electoral district. The council is responsible for reviewing and adopting budgets and appropriations. It can also enact, repeal, or amend ordinances, and make appointments to certain boards and commissions, among other duties. Council offices and the public assembly room are housed in the City-County Building.

History

City Council (1832–1891)

Robert Bruce Bagby was elected as the city's first African American to serve on the Indianapolis City Council in 1877.

Common Council (1891–1970)

Nannette Dowd became the first woman elected to Indianapolis Common Council in the 1934 municipal election.

City-County Council (1970–present)
Following the launch of Unigov on January 1, 1970, members of the former Indianapolis Common Council and the Marion County Council were combined to form the first City-County Council. The council was composed of 29 seats: 25 representing geographic districts and four at-large. The first City-County Council election occurred on November 2, 1971.

In the 2011 Indianapolis City-County Council election, Zach Adamson was elected as the first openly gay member of the council, representing District 17.

In April 2013, the Indiana General Assembly passed Senate Enrolled Act 621 which outlined several changes to city-county government, including eliminating the council's four at-large seats following the 2015 Indianapolis City-County Council election. The controversial bill was signed into law by Governor Mike Pence.

The 2019 Indianapolis City-County Council election proved historic. Democrats flipped six Republican seats to earn the party's first supermajority since the council's creation in 1970. Ali Brown became the first openly queer-identifying woman to serve on the council, representing District 5. Along with the reelection of Adamson, Brown was joined by fellow newcomers Ethan Evans (District 4) and Keith Potts (District 2), respectively—the most LGBTQ members in the council's history.

Composition

The Indianapolis City-County Council consists of 25 seats corresponding to 25 electoral districts apportioned by population throughout Marion County. Because the council is the legislative body for both the city and the county, residents of Marion County's four "excluded cities" (Beech Grove, Lawrence, Southport, and Speedway) are eligible to vote in council elections and are equally represented alongside Indianapolis residents. Every seat is up for reelection every four years. The head of the council is the council president who is elected by the majority party at the council's first meeting in January.

Following the 2019 elections, Democrats expanded their control of the council with a 20–5 majority. This marked the first time in Indianapolis history that Democrats have held a supermajority on the council. The clerk of the council is SaRita Hughes.

Current members

Standing committees

Salary
Members of the council earn an annual salary of $11,400, plus per diems of $112 per council meeting and $62 per committee meeting. Ordinance stipulates that annual base pay is capped at 12 percent of the mayor's salary ($95,000). In June 2022, councilors approved revisions to the ordinance for the first time in more than 20 years, increasing the annual salary to $31,075, in addition to per diems of $150 per council meeting and $75 per committee meeting. The ordinance will take effect in 2024, following the 2023 Indianapolis City-County Council election.

Pertinent issues
Scooters Removal/Regulations
Addressing Potholes
Improve Downtown
BlueIndy
Equity and Equality
Council Pay Raise

Former councilors

Roger W. Brown (1972–1976)
Paul Cantwell (1970–1979)
Jeff Cardwell (2008–2013)
André Carson (2007–2008)
Ray Crowe (1984–1987)
Aaron Freeman (2010–2016)
Phillip Hinkle (1992–2000)
Glenn L. Howard (1975–1992)
Blake Johnson (2016–2020)
Cherrish Pryor (2007–2008)
John C. Ruckelshaus (1971–1975)
Jack Sandlin (2010–2016)
Scott Schneider (2000–2008)
Beurt SerVaas (1961–2002)
Mike Speedy (2004–2010)

See also
Government of Indianapolis
List of mayors of Indianapolis

Notes

References

External links
Indianapolis City-County Council

City-County Council
City-County Council
Indiana city councils